Ma'ale Hever or Pnei Hever is an Israeli settlement in the West Bank. Located in the eastern Hebron hills to the east of Hebron at an elevation of 810 metres, it is organised as a community settlement and falls under the jurisdiction of Har Hevron Regional Council.

The international community considers Israeli settlements in the West Bank illegal under international law, but the Israeli government as well as the United States government, as of 2019, disputes this.

History
The settlement was established as Nahal Yakin on 31 January 1982 as a pioneer Nahal military outpost. It was demilitarized when turned over to eleven families on 24 August 1983, after which it was renamed after the nearby Hever Stream. In its early years, the only route leading to the village passed through the Palestinian town of Bani Na'im.

In 2009, Assaf Ramon, son of Israeli astronaut Ilan Ramon who was aboard the fatal Columbia mission when the Space Shuttle exploded, was killed when the F-16 he was flying crashed in the vicinity of Ma'ale Hever.

References

External links
Profile on Amana website
Pnei Hever | Maale Hever Site 

Nahal settlements
Religious Israeli settlements
Populated places established in 1982
1982 establishments in the Palestinian territories
Community settlements
Israeli settlements in the West Bank